Pen-bont-rhyd-y-beddau is a small village in the  community of Trefeurig, Ceredigion, Wales, which is 73.7 miles (118.6 km) from Cardiff and 174.8 miles (281.3 km) from London. Pen-bont Rhydybeddau is represented in the  Senedd by Elin Jones and the Member of Parliament is Ben Lake both representing Plaid Cymru.

References

See also
List of localities in Wales by population 

Villages in Ceredigion